The Open Arts Network is a national network of membership-based arts organizations with the goals of sharing resources and reducing duplication of effort. The Open Arts Network was started by Fractured Atlas in 2004.  Fractured Atlas discontinued the network in 2017.

As of May 2007, the following organizations were members of the Open Arts Network:

Fractured Atlas
3rd Ward
ACCI Gallery
Art for Progress
Artfag Mafia
ArtistShare
Asian American Arts Alliance
Atlanta Coalition of Performing Arts
Austin Circle of Theaters
Black Rock Coalition
Children's Museum of the Arts
College Art Association
Columbia University School of the Arts Alumni Association
Dance Theater Workshop
Elizabeth Foundation for the Arts
The Field
International Forum of Visual Practitioners
Lower Manhattan Cultural Council
New York Folklore Society
Shooting People
Theatre Bay Area
Theatre Puget Sound
Williamsburg Gallery Association
Women's Caucus for Art

References

Supraorganizations
Arts organizations based in New York City
Arts organizations established in 2004
2004 establishments in New York (state)